The 1930 Wyoming gubernatorial election took place on November 4, 1930. Incumbent Republican Governor Frank Emerson ran for re-election. As was the case with Emerson's first election in 1926, he faced a tight race. He was opposed by State Senator Leslie A. Miller, the Democratic nominee. Ultimately, Emerson narrowly won re-election over Miller, winning 51-49%, and by a margin of just 870 votes. However, Emerson did not end up serving his full term; he died on February 18, 1931, just a few weeks into his second term, triggering a special election in 1932.

Democratic primary

Candidates
 Leslie A. Miller, State Senator

Results

Republican Primary

Candidates
 Frank Emerson, incumbent Governor
 William H. Edelman, Wyoming State Treasurer

Results

Results

References

1930 Wyoming elections
1930
Wyoming
November 1930 events